The Estonian Children's Literature Centre (in ) is a centre devoted to children's literature from Estonia. It is located at Pikk 73 in Tallinn's old town and is open daily for visitors. The history of the centre dates back to 1933.

External links
 

Organizations based in Tallinn
Estonian children's literature